The Vega Ancestral House is one of the 1st Transition Bahay na Bato inspired houses that has remained standing and has witnessed the different colonial periods of the Philippines through its estimated 200 years of existence. Sculpted wooden Atlases are perhaps the most interesting feature of this house that is located in Poblacion, Balingasag, Misamis Oriental. Sculpted wooden atlases, known as "Oti-ot" in the Visayan language, provide support to the second floor protrusion of the house. This house is one important structure in the locality that tourists usually come to visit. Notable personalities like Emilio Aguinaldo and Sergio Osmeña had visited this house.

History
In the 1800s, a young merchant from San Nicolas in Cebu by the name of Ignacio Juan Vega settled in Northern Mindanao at a small town now called Balingasag, then named Galas. It was through Vega that the Cebuano devotion to the Sto. Nino was introduced to the townsfolk of Balingasag. Aside from this cultural practice that he imparted, he also left behind a heritage house that is considered these days as one of the most important landmarks that can be found in Misamis Oriental.

The house also witnessed the political endeavor of its owners. The first town executive came from the Vega Clan in the person of Faustino Vega. He was known in that time as presidente local under the short-lived First Philippine Republic (1898-1903). Melquiades Vega, the son of Faustino Vega, served as the first presidente local under the American Regime (1903-1928).

Though there are no existing documents that would trace back to a specific year when this house was constructed, several attempts by heritage advocates to document this house and as well as bloggers and the local townsfolk say that this house was built in the 1800s.

House features

It is noteworthy to mention that the house is designed with sculpted wooden men that act as support structures to the protruding second floor of the house. Unlike what other feature writers would say, there are only three wooden men that exist. There is one corner where no wooden men structure can be seen. In other words, each corner of the house is not represented by an atlas as what several travel bloggers would state in their blogs and articles.

There are also misconceptions regarding the three sculpted wooden structures of men. Others say that this is a paradigm of slavery while others would say that this is inspired by the atlas icon that symbolizes the man carrying the world. The true account on this, according to Dr. Antonio J. Montalvan II and with reference to the genealogy of the Vega Clan, is that the three sculptures represent the three sons of Ignacio Juan Vega, namely Santos (married to Valentina Roa, Juana Valmores), Pedro (married to Benita Salvacion), and Gregorio.

The house uses "molave" tree and "balayong" as the primary building material. It can also be observed that the house has large beams or pillars that act as support to the overall stability of the house structure. Each pillar is placed alongside the corners, in between the corners and along the center of the house. Its walls are designed like woven abaca, called "Uway" (English: rattan) in visayan as that is colored in yellow.  The house still uses the traditional "Banggera" (English:Sink) which is used as window shelf for kitchen wares and utensils and tub for washing at present.

Another notable feature of the house is its uppermost portion which still uses the classical cogon for the roof. It further classifies the house under the 1st Transition of Bahay na bato aside from its emerging stone works at the bottom part of the house.

Another feature of the house can also be observed in its support beams that are decorated with the chambered nautilus motif.

One can conclude that the owner of the house used the best quality of materials during its construction as is evidenced by the house which has withstood the tests of time through centuries. Consequently, this heritage structure is one of the primary attractions to tourists and outsiders who come to visit the rich historical center (Poblacion) of Balingasag.

Tourism

The coffee table books and glossy calendars (the latest one being the 2006 Shell calendar ["Homes of our Heritage"] help in the provision of a constant stream of onlookers and curio watchers which improve the local tourism statistics of the municipality.

According to Ms. Nanette Vega, the local tourism authority wishes to acquire the house through legal processes so as to maintain and preserve the house and open it as a tourism hotspot. Ms. Nanette and the Vega clan decline the proposal for sentimental reasons. While they admit that they find it hard to maintain the house -- especially the cost incurred for the maintenance -- they prefer to take care of the house than lose ownership to the local tourism authority. However, the house is still open for walk-in tourists, and those who wish to have a visit of the house may do so by appointment basis.

One highlight of this house that adds to its fame is its association with the late Maria Clara Vega Jimenez - mother of the famous television personality Inday Badiday and Philippine Daily Inquirer editor-in-chief Letty Jimenez Magsanoc. However, it is wrong to refer to it as the "Jimenez House" because the Jimenez was just one branch of the Vega Clan. It is locally known by its correct name, "Vega House".

Common misconception also regarding this house is its connection with the late and famous bygone child star Julie Vega because of her "Vega" stage surname which is in reality is Julie Pearl Apostol Postigo. This widespread rumor among those who are not familiar enough with the house is still erroneously passed up to these present times.

Present Times

As of the present days, the first floor of the house is being utilized as a restaurant/carinderia. The store opens as early as 6:00 in the morning and closes at 7:00 in the evening. Part of the income from the store is used for the maintenance of the house.

Neighboring Heritage Houses

See also
Ancestral houses of the Philippines

References

External links
"Weekend Getaway: The Vega House, Balingasag, Misamis Oriental", travel blog with photos
"The Vega Ancestral House in Balingasag, Misamis Oriental", travel blog with photos 	
"The Vega House: An Ancestral House in Balingasag", travel blog with photos
"I love balingasag" photo

Heritage Houses in the Philippines
Buildings and structures in Misamis Oriental